Maryland House of Delegates District 45 is one of 47 legislative districts in the state of Maryland and is one of the 5 located entirely within Baltimore City.

Voters in this district select three delegates every four years to represent them in the Maryland House of Delegates.

Demographic characteristics
As of the 2020 United States census, the district had a population of 107,403, of whom 83,995 (78.2%) were of voting age. The racial makeup of the district was 18,445 (17.2%) White, 77,798 (72.4%) African American, 435 (0.4%) Native American, 1,808 (1.7%) Asian, 24 (0.0%) Pacific Islander, 3,749 (3.5%) from some other race, and 5,135 (4.8%) from two or more races. Hispanic or Latino of any race were 6,206 (5.8%) of the population.

The district had 75,097 registered voters as of October 17, 2020, of whom 8,776 (11.7%) were registered as unaffiliated, 4,773 (6.4%) were registered as Republicans, 60,488 (80.5%) were registered as Democrats, and 669 (0.9%) were registered to other parties.

Educational institutions

High schools
The 45th district is home to Baltimore's storied Dunbar High School. Dunbar High opened 1918 as the Paul Laurence Dunbar Elementary School, No. 101, as part of the separate "colored schools" system then in place in the Baltimore City Public Schools system which was abolished by 1954.  It was named in memory of Paul Laurence Dunbar, a famous African-American poet, who had died ten years earlier. 
The district is also home to the Heritage High School and the REACH! Partnership School.

Universities
After the 2010 census and the subsequent re-districting, the University of Baltimore and University of Baltimore School of Law are now part of the 45th district.
The University of Baltimore School of Law is housed in the new John and Frances Angelos Law Center, at the corner of Mount Royal Ave. and N. Charles St. on the University of Baltimore's main campus in the Mt. Vernon cultural district.

Political representation
The district is represented for the 2023–2027 legislative term in the State Senate by Cory V. McCray (D) and in the House of Delegates by Jackie Addison (D), Caylin Young (D) and Stephanie M. Smith (D).

Election results

References

Baltimore
45
45